is a retired Japanese athlete who specialised in the javelin throw. She twice competed at World Championships failing to qualify for the final round. With a personal best of 61.15 metres, she is a former Japanese record holder in the event.

International competitions

References

1974 births
Living people
Japanese female javelin throwers
Asian Games competitors for Japan
Athletes (track and field) at the 2002 Asian Games
Competitors at the 1995 Summer Universiade
World Athletics Championships athletes for Japan
Japan Championships in Athletics winners
20th-century Japanese women